The Herman's Hermits Hits EP by Herman's Hermits was the band's third EP and was released in the United Kingdom by EMI/Columbia (catalogue number SEG 8442.)

Track listing 
Side 1
"Silhouettes" (Bob Crewe, Frank Slay Jr.) - 2:19
"Wonderful World" (Lou Adler, Herb Alpert, Sam Cooke) - 1:58

Side 2
"Can't You Hear My Heartbeat" (John Carter, Ken Lewis) - 2:16
"I'm Into Something Good" (Gerry Goffin, Carole King)

External links 
plutomusic.com

Herman's Hermits albums
1965 EPs
EMI Records EPs